Bathyuriscus is an extinct genus of Cambrian trilobite. It was a nektobenthic predatory carnivore. The genus Bathyuriscus is endemic to the shallow seas that surrounded Laurentia. Its major characteristics are a large forward-reaching glabella, pointed pleurae or pleurae with very short spines, and a medium pygidium with well-impressed furrows. Complete specimens have never reached the size of 7 cm predicted by the largest pygidium found. Bathyuriscus is often found with the free cheeks shed, indicating a moulted exoskeleton. An average specimen will in addition have a furrowed glabella, crescent-shaped eyes, be semi-circular in overall body shape, have 7 to 9 thoracic segments, and a length of about 1.5 inches.

Etymology 
Bathyuriscus is a variation of Bathyurus, originally based on the Ancient Greek βαθύς (bathys) "deep", oura, "tail", thus, a trilobite with a deep tail.

Distribution 
Species belonging to Bathyuriscus have been found in the Marjumian of the United States (New York) and in the Middle Cambrian of Australia, Canada (British Columbia, especially in the Burgess Shale, and Newfoundland), Greenland, Mexico, and the United States (Alaska, Idaho, Montana, Nevada, Pennsylvania, Utah, and Vermont).

References

 Shah, S.K., Parcha, S.K. & Raina, A.K. (1991). Late Cambrian trilobites from Himalaya. Journal of the Palaeontological Society of India 36:89-107.
 Robison, R.A. (1964). Late Middle Cambrian Faunas from Western Utah. Journal of Paleontology 38(3):510-566

External links 
 

Corynexochida genera
Dolichometopidae
Cambrian trilobites of Australia
Burgess Shale fossils
Cambrian trilobites of Europe
Cambrian trilobites of North America
Cambrian genus extinctions
Wheeler Shale
Paleozoic life of Newfoundland and Labrador